Verona is a village in Grundy County, Illinois. The population was 215 at the 2010 census.

The community was established circa 1876 by George D. Smith as a station on the Chicago, Pekin and Southwestern Railroad.  Smith named the town for his birthplace Verona, New York.

Geography
Verona is located at  (41.215459, -88.502631).

Demographics

As of the census of 2000, there were 257 people, 88 households, and 69 families residing in the village. The racial makeup of the village was 94.94% White, 1.56% Native American, 3.11% from other races, and 0.39% from two or more races. Hispanic or Latino of any race were 12.06% of the population.

There were 88 households, out of which 43.2% had children under the age of 18 living with them, 71.6% were married couples living together, 6.8% had a female householder with no husband present, and 20.5% were non-families. 18.2% of all households were made up of individuals, and 10.2% had someone living alone who was 65 years of age or older.  The average household size was 2.92 and the average family size was 3.34.

In the village, the population was spread out, with 30.7% under the age of 18, 5.4% from 18 to 24, 31.9% from 25 to 44, 19.5% from 45 to 64, and 12.5% who were 65 years of age or older.  The median age was 36 years. For every 100 females, there were 104.0 males.  For every 100 females age 18 and over, there were 97.8 males.

The median income for a household in the village was $46,094, and the median income for a family was $53,571. Males had a median income of $35,156 versus $21,042 for females. The per capita income for the village was $16,387.  About 4.5% of families and 5.2% of the population were below the poverty line, including 9.8% of those under the age of eighteen and 3.1% of those 65 or over.

References

Villages in Grundy County, Illinois
Villages in Illinois
1876 establishments in Illinois